Ilona Jurševska (born 20 August 1970) is a Latvian politician, member of the Latvian Farmers' Union and the incumbent Minister of Welfare of Latvia since 3 November 2010.

References

1970 births
Living people
People from Līvāni Municipality
Latvian Farmers' Union politicians
Ministers of Welfare of Latvia
Deputies of the 11th Saeima
Women government ministers of Latvia
Women deputies of the Saeima
University of Liepāja alumni

21st-century Latvian women politicians